The Price-Prather House is a historic house located at the intersection of Main and Elkhart Streets in Williamsville, Illinois. The house was built in 1868 for livestock breeder James R. Price. The Italianate house features a multi-component slate roof, a bracketed and dentillated cornice, a wraparound front porch, and long arched windows with brick hoods. Cattle breeder John F. Prather purchased the house in 1882. Prather was an influential Shorthorn cattle breeder; as one of the earliest cattlemen to breed shorthorns in Illinois, he became recognized as an authority on the breed, and he served as president of the American Shorthorn Association and a member of the State Board of Agriculture.

The house was added to the National Register of Historic Places on May 13, 1991.

References

Houses on the National Register of Historic Places in Illinois
Italianate architecture in Illinois
Houses completed in 1868
National Register of Historic Places in Sangamon County, Illinois
Houses in Sangamon County, Illinois